The Counterterrorism Center or Counterterrorism Mission Center is a part of the U.S. Central Intelligence Agency

Counterterrorism Center or Counter Terrorism Centre may also refer to:

Australia
 Australian Counter-Terrorism Centre

Hungary
 Counter Terrorism Centre, a law enforcement agency

India
 National Counter Terrorism Centre, a proposed government agency

United States
 National Counterterrorism Center, a government agency

See also
 Counter Terrorist Unit